Radijus Vektor (full legal name: Radijus Vektor d.o.o.) is a Serbian company providing cable television and high-speed Internet, headquartered in Belgrade, Serbia.

Radijus Vektor Postao Supernova

History

Radijus Vektor was established on 25 May 1998.

As of 2017, Radijus Vektor was the fifth-largest cable operator in Serbia, with 3% of market share. On 6 January 2019, the Serbian largest telecommunication company Telekom Srbija acquired Radijus Vektor for 108 million euros.

References

External links
  

1998 establishments in Serbia
2019 mergers and acquisitions
Companies based in Belgrade
Telecommunications companies established in 1998
D.o.o. companies in Serbia
Telecommunications companies of Serbia